Pune Vidhyarthi Griha's College of Engineering and Technology  is an engineering college affiliated with the University of Pune, located in Maharashtra, India. It was established in 1985 and is situated in Pune. The college is approved by the All India Council for Technical Education and by the government of Maharashtra. The college is co-ed.

Campus
The campus is urban, located in the city of Pune. It is situated on eight acres of land.

Courses Offered
The courses offered are all engineering focused.  For example, 
Computer Engineering
Information Technology
Printing Engineering
Mechanical engineering
Electrical engineering
Electronics and Telecommunication engineering
Artificial Intelligence and Data Science

Staff and notable alumni 

There are 86 faculty working at the college as of 2020.
Notable alumni from the college include: 
Ram Satpute, Member of Maharashtra Legislative Assembly (Vidhan Sabha) elected from Malshiras (Vidhan Sabha constituency).
Samay Raina, stand up comic and youtuber

References

External links
 

All India Council for Technical Education
Colleges affiliated to Savitribai Phule Pune University
Engineering colleges in Pune
Universities and colleges in Pune
Educational institutions established in 1985
1985 establishments in Maharashtra